Eland Books is an independent London-based publishing house founded in 1982 with the aim of republishing and reviving classic travel books that have fallen out of print over time.

Its list currently runs to around 160 titles and is highly regarded by critics and book reviewers. Eland authors include:
Nigel Barley (anthropologist)
Nicolas Bouvier
Evilya Celebi
Winston Churchill
E.M. Forster
Martha Gellhorn
Lucie, Lady Duff-Gordon
W.H. Hudson
Arthur Koestler
Peter Levi
Norman Lewis (author)
Gavin Maxwell
Peter Mayne
Mary Wortley Montagu
Jan Morris
Dervla Murphy
Irfan Orga
Tony Parker
Dilys Powell
Jonathan Raban
Leonard Woolf
Ronald Wright

Eland began from an office in the attic of John Hatt, a former magazine travel editor, in a Victorian end-of-terrace house at 53 Eland Road, in Battersea, south-west London.

It is run today by former travel guidebook authors Barnaby Rogerson and his wife Rose Baring. Although its list has diversified into biography and fiction, the majority of the titles remain tales of travel.

Rogerson explained that Eland's mission is "to celebrate the diversity of the world, offering up 'anthropology-lite' under the blanket cover of preserving the best travel writing as well as to preserve the stories about past societies that have been destroyed by the modern world – precious little building blocks of other ways in which to live, from which a better world may one day be constructed by our heirs."

"Eland offers an armchair way of getting to know our fellow earthlings", added co-publisher Rose Baring.

See also
:Category:Eland Books books
Naples '44

References

External links

Eland Books

Book publishing companies of the United Kingdom
Publishing companies established in 1982
British companies established in 1982